Mustat Lesket is a 2014 Finnish television series created by Mikko Pöllä, directed by Veikko Aaltonen and starring Pihla Viitala as Veera Joentie, Wanda Dubiel as Johanna Koskinen and Malla Malmivaara as Kirsi Lundberg. It was remade in 2016 as Black Widows.

In other languages 
It has been remade in various languages:

 remade as Mujeres de negro by Mexican Las Estrellas in 2016.
 remade as  حجر جهنم in Egyptian language in 2017.
 remade as Černé vdovy by Czech Prima televize.
 remade as Black Widows in Hindi language in 2020.

References

External links 
 

2014 Finnish television series debuts
Nelonen original programming